Fibrillanosema crangonycis is a species of fungus in the phylum Microsporidia. This species is morphologically identical to uncharacterized microsporidia from populations of North American amphipods. It is, however, distinct from microsporidia found in European populations of amphipods.

References

External links
Invasion Success of Fibrillanosema crangonycis, N.SP., N.G.: a novel vertically transmitted microsporidian parasite from the invasive amphipod host Crangonyx pseudogracilis

Microsporidia